Below is a sortable list of compositions by Marcel Dupré.  The works are categorized by genre, opus number, date of composition and titles.

References
 Delestre, Robert. L'Œuvre de Marcel Dupré, Paris: Éditions Musique Sacrée, 1952.

Dupre, Marcel